Assam Jawa is a small town in Kuala Selangor District, Selangor, Malaysia. This town has a T-junction which connects Kuala Selangor to Kuala Lumpur through Jalan Kuala SelangorFederal Route 54.

Highway
In this town, there is a junction which connects Jalan Kapar Federal Route 5 and two expressways which are still under construction. The expressways which are under construction are the Kuala Lumpur–Kuala Selangor Expressway (KLKSE) and the West Coast Expressway (WCE). However, they were nearer to Ijok than Assam Jawa.

Kuala Selangor District
Towns in Selangor